A bed of nails is a board with nails pointing out of it, as lain on by fakirs and ascetics.

Bed of nails may also refer to:
 "Bed of Nails" (song), a 1989 single by American rock singer Alice Cooper
 "Bed of Nails", a song by Hüsker Dü from their 1987 album Warehouse: Songs and Stories
 Bed of Nails, a 2003 novel by Canadian author Michael Slade
 Bed of nails tester, a device used to test printed circuit boards
 "The Bed of Nails" (Yes Minister), the nineteenth episode of the BBC comedy series Yes Minister

See also 
 Nail bed (disambiguation)